Lake City is a city in Clayton County, Georgia, United States. The population was 2,612 at the 2010 census.

History
The Georgia General Assembly incorporated Lake City in 1951. The community was named for a lake which once was located at the town site, but since has been filled in.

Geography
Lake City is located in northern Clayton County at  (33.608109, -84.340481). It is bordered to the south by Morrow and to the west and north by Forest Park. Fort Gillem is directly to the north, within the Forest Park city limits.

Demographics

2020 census

As of the 2020 United States census, there were 2,952 people, 597 households, and 410 families residing in the city.

2000 census
As of the census of 2000, there were 2,886 people, 950 households, and 690 families residing in the city. The racial makeup of the city was 51.91% White, 32.22% African American, 0.94% Native American, 9.67% Asian, 0.14% Pacific Islander, 3.19% from other races, and 1.94% from two or more races. Hispanic or Latino people of any race were 7.48% of the population.

There were 950 households, out of which 32.4% had children under the age of 18 living with them, 47.5% were married couples living together, 17.4% had a female householder with no husband present, and 27.3% were non-families. 21.2% of all households were made up of individuals, and 7.5% had someone living alone who was 65 years of age or older.  The average household size was 2.78 and the average family size was 3.18.

In the city, the population was spread out, with 23.6% under the age of 18, 8.3% from 18 to 24, 28.8% from 25 to 44, 21.3% from 45 to 64, and 18.0% who were 65 years of age or older.  The median age was 37 years. For every 100 females, there were 92.0 males.  For every 100 females age 18 and over, there were 85.8 males.

The median income for a household in the city was $38,929, and the median income for a family was $42,600. Males had a median income of $26,875 versus $24,490 for females. The per capita income for the city was $15,877.  About 8.5% of families and 8.7% of the population were below the poverty line, including 16.2% of those under age 18 and none of those age 65 or over.

Infrastructure

Transit systems
MARTA serves the city.

Education
Clayton County Public Schools operates public schools.

References

External links
Lake City official website

Cities in Georgia (U.S. state)
Cities in Clayton County, Georgia
Cities in the Atlanta metropolitan area